Plaisir is a commune located in the heart of the Yvelines department in the Île-de-France in north-central France. It is located in the western suburbs of Paris,  from the center of Paris.

It borders among others on Élancourt (south), Trappes (southeast) and Les Clayes-sous-Bois (east).

Plaisir has managed to preserve its twelfth century church. Its varied territory is characterised by large agricultural plains, many green spaces and a forest area that together occupy half of its surface.

Plaisir is the twelfth commune of the Yvelines department in terms of population, with nearly 31,000 inhabitants. It is a member of the communauté d'agglomération Saint-Quentin-en-Yvelines.

Between 1968 and 1990, Plaisir has seen explosive growth in its population, but since then, the town's policy has been to contain growth and aim for stabilisation, in order to main the local quality of living as well as the natural spaces (forests and agricultural lands).

It has a major shopping mall that is still expanding. This commercial activity has been a boon for local tax revenues, but also led to congestion of its roads.

Aside from this commercial activity, Plaisir is also home to a number of other activities, for instance it is home to the Zodiaxc corporation and hosts the Lenôtre culinary school which attracts students from across the globe.

Population

The inhabitants are called Plaisirois.

Transport
Plaisir is served by two stations on the Transilien Paris-Montparnasse suburban rail line: Plaisir – Les Clayes and Plaisir – Grignon

Education
The commune has 17 preschools with 1,560 students and 13 elementary schools with 2,273 students, with a total of 3,843 students.

Secondary schools in Plaisir:
Collège Guillaume-Apollinaire
Collège Blaise-Pascal et SEGPA
Lycée Jean Vilar

Secondary schools in nearby municipalities:
 Collège La-Fosse-aux-Dames (Les Clayes-sous-Bois)
 Collège La-Clef-de-Saint-Pierre (Elancourt)

Twin towns
Plaisir is twinned with Lowestoft, England and Bad Aussee, Austria.

See also
Communes of the Yvelines department

References

External links
Plaisir city council website

Communes of Yvelines